The Gloire-class ironclads were a group of three wooden-hulled armored frigates built for the French Navy in the late 1850s and early 1860s. , the lead ship of the class, was the first ocean-going ironclad warship to be built by any country. The ships of the Gloire class were classified as armoured frigates because they only had a single gun deck and their traditional disposition of guns arrayed along the length of the hull also meant that they were broadside ironclads.

Design and description
Designed by the French naval architect Henri Dupuy de Lôme, the ships of the class were intended to fight in the line of battle, unlike the first British ironclads. They had a crew of 570 officers and enlisted men.

The ships of the Gloire class had a single horizontal return connecting-rod compound steam engine that drove a six-bladed,  propeller. On sea trials, the ships exceeded .

The ships were initially armed with 36 Modèle 1858  rifled muzzle-loading guns, 34（14 each sides and 2 pivot mounts fore and 4 pivot mounts aft as chase guns）of which were positioned on the single gun deck in the broadside. The remaining two guns were placed on the upper deck as chase guns. They fired a  shell at a muzzle velocity of only  and proved to be ineffective against armour. They were replaced by rifled breech-loading Modèle 1864 guns in 1868. Four of six 194 and eight  guns were mounted in the middle of the gun deck and a pair of remaining  guns replaced the original chase guns.

Ships

Service
All three ships of the class had very uneventful careers, spending the bulk of their time with the Mediterranean Fleet aside from a few excursions to foreign waters. Normandie supported the French intervention in Mexico in 1862, the first ironclad to cross the Atlantic. They were active during the Franco-Prussian War, but saw no action. Gloire, the only ship built with seasoned timber lasted the longest, not being condemned and broken up until 1879. Her sister ships only lasted a decade in service before they were too rotten for any further use and were condemned in 1871–1872 and subsequently broken up.

Footnotes

Bibliography

 

 
 

Ironclad classes
 
Ships built in France
Ironclad warships of the French Navy
Ship classes of the French Navy